Alfonso Reyes Station is a station on Line 1 of the Monterrey Metro. It is located in the intersection of Rodrigo Gomez and Alfonso Reyes Avenues in Monterrey, México. This station is located in the Colon Avenue in the northeast side of the Monterrey Centre. The station was opened on 25 April 1991 as part of the inaugural section of Line 1, going from San Bernabé to Exposición.

This station serves the Nueva Morelos and Central neighborhoods (Colonias Nueva Morelos y Central). It is accessible for people with disabilities.

This station is named after Alfonso Reyes Avenue, and its logo represents a book, since Alfonso Reyes was a great writer and whom the Avenue is named after.

References

Metrorrey stations
Railway stations opened in 1991
1991 establishments in Mexico